Gohar Ayub Khan (born 15 January 1937) is a Pakistani politician, business oligarch, retired army officer, and conservative figure of the Pakistan Muslim League, who held ministerial positions during the administration of prime minister Nawaz Sharif.

Gohar Ayub Khan hails from the village of Rehana, located in the Haripur District of Khyber Pakhtunkhwa province and belongs to the Tareen tribe of ethnic Pashtuns. He is fluent in Hindko and Pashto. He is the son of former president and field marshal Ayub Khan and played an influential role in sustaining his father's presidential rule after the 1965 presidential election. Educated at the Royal Military Academy Sandhurst, after graduation Gohar Ayub Khan was commissioned in the Pakistan Army in 1959. During his military service he served as his father's aide-de-camp, travelling with him on several foreign trips. Upon his resignation in 1962 with the rank of captain, he established a business conglomerate and entered in politics in 1974.

He first contested the 1977 general election through the Independence Movement platform, but later joined the Islamic Democratic Alliance (IDA) in 1988. After the 1990 general election he was appointed as the fourteenth speaker of the National Assembly. He became the 20th minister of Foreign Affairs after securing his seat with a heavy margin in the 1997 general election. Later he shifted to the energy department, serving as Minister for Water and Power beginning 7 August 1998. His term abruptly ended on 12 October 1999, by General Pervez Musharraf, and he subsequently retired from national politics.

Early life and military career
Gohar Ayub Khan was born in the village of Rehana, in Haripur District during the British Raj in the North-West Frontier Province (present day Khyber Pakhtunkhwa) into a military family on 15 January 1937. Although a Hindko speaker, Gohar Ayub is fluent in his native language Pashto and comes from a Pashtun family that belongs to the Tareen tribe of Pashtuns. His father, Ayub Khan, was a senior commanding officer in the British Army and later ascended to staff and field operational assignments in the Pakistan Army. Ayub Khan subsequently became President of Pakistan through a bloodless military coup that commenced in 1958.

Gohar Ayub was sent to study at the military-controlled Army Burn Hall College and eventually moved on to attend Saint Mary's Academy, a private school in Rawalpindi. Gohar Ayub joined the Pakistan Army in 1957, and trained at the Royal Military Academy Sandhurst in the United Kingdom. Upon his return from the UK, he began serving active duty with the Pakistan Army and started to work on staff appointments. In 1958 he began to serve as his father's aide-de-camp, travelling with him on several foreign trips throughout Europe, the Americas, the Soviet Union and Asia. He did not rise beyond the rank of Captain during his time in the army, despite his father's support. In his army records, there are allegations of professional and behavioral misconduct.

Gohar Ayub was prematurely given retirement in 1962 by the Army's Promotion Branch, despite his father's efforts to stop the investigations against his son. After his early retirement he and his father-in-law, General (retired) Habibullah Khan established a private industrial firm, the Universal Insurance Co. Ltd.

During the 1971 War, Gohar Ayub briefly returned to active service, seeing action in the Punjab border areas.

Politics

Business wealth and net worth
Gohar Ayub co-established an industrial firm under the business umbrella of Universal Insurance company Limited, founded by his father-in-law. During a short span of time, Ayub Khan intensified pro-Western and pro-Capitalism policies, and Gohar Ayub emerged as a powerful business oligarch. There is no evidence that suggests Gohar Ayub secured all these positions with the consent of his father. In 1969, a Western commentator estimated Gohar Ayub's personal wealth at $4 million, while his family's wealth was put in the range of $10–20 million.

Role in the 1965 presidential election
Gohar Ayub reportedly played an influential, but controversial, role in Karachi after his father's election in the allegedly rigged 1965 Presidential election against Fatima Jinnah. This move led to fierce clashes between rival political groups. Gohar Ayub also faced criticism during that time on questions of family corruption and cronyism through his business links with his father-in-law.

Speaker of the National Assembly
Gohar Ayub had been a long-standing member of the Pakistan Muslim League and was elected five times to the National Assembly from his home constituency. He first successfully contested a presidential election in March 1965 on a Muslim League platform. In 1977, he contested the National Assembly seat from Peshawar Jail and was elected on the ticket of Asghar Khan's Independence Movement party, defeating the candidate Akhtar Nawaz Khan of the Pakistan People's Party.

After successfully contesting the 1990 general election, Gohar Ayub was appointed as the 14th Speaker of the National Assembly of Pakistan on 4 November 1990, remaining until 1993. He was succeeded by Yousaf Raza Gillani (later Prime minister) after the 1993 general election. Gohar Ayub also served as senior vice-president of the Pakistan Muslim League from 1990 to 1993. After his re-election in 1993, Gohar Ayub became deputy leader of the opposition in the National Assembly.

Foreign affairs and water and power ministry
After securing a heavy mandate from his constituency, Gohar Ayub was appointed as the 20th Minister of Foreign Affairs in 1997 by Prime Minister Nawaz Sharif. Gohar Ayub publicly backed Prime Minister Sharif in authorizing a nuclear testing programme in response to India's nuclear test in May 1998. Although the prime minister was much more subdued, Gohar Ayub reportedly issued hostile statements and began to call for atomic tests in response to India. He prematurely issued media reports to the media, which reportedly displeased the prime minister.

On 7 August 1998, Gohar Ayub was replaced by economic minister Sartaj Aziz (who put forth efforts to make peace between India and Pakistan), and was reassigned as Minister for Water and Power, a position he filled until he was ousted and forced to resign on 12 October 1999 as a result of a military coup commenced by General Pervez Musharraf.

Gohar Ayub's relationship with Nawaz Sharif eventually became strained, causing Gohar Ayub to leave the Pakistan Muslim League in 1999. Gohar Ayub defected to the Pakistan Muslim League's splinter group in 2001. He was appointed as the first secretary general of the party. Unable to contest the 2002 election because of a graduation degree restriction introduced by Pervez Musharraf, Gohar Ayub instead endorsed and provide vital support to his family. His younger son, Omar Ayub Khan, won his Haripur District seat, while his wife Zeb Gohar Ayub was elected MNA on the reserved women seats. To date, Gohar Ayub's strongest political opponent in his constituency has been former Chief Minister Raja Sikander Zaman.

Business

Gohar Ayub Khan still serves as Chief Executive of Universal Insurance and is on the board of several other companies in his in laws the Khan Khattak family's corporation the Bibojee Group.

Post-retirement and controversies
After his retirement from national politics in 2002, Gohar Ayub wrote Glimpses into the Corridors of Power and published his father's diary. He opposed the proposal to rename the NWFP to Khyber-Pakhtunkhwa, while supporting the creation of a separate Hazara province.

Books
 Glimpses Into the Corridors of Power, Karachi: Oxford University Press, 2007, 354 p. Autobiography.
 Testing Times as Foreign Minister, Islamabad: Dost Publications, 2009, 352 p. Autobiography.
 Shikar: In The Days Gone By, Islamabad: Dost Publications, 2009, 148 p. On hunting.
 Aivān-i iqtidār ke mushāhidāt, Lahore: Sang-e-Mil Publications, 2018, 364 p. Autobiography.

See also
 Omar Ayub Khan
 Iskander Mirza

External links
 Universal Insurance: Board of Directors

References

|-

1937 births
Gohar
Foreign Ministers of Pakistan
Hindkowan people
Living people
Nawaz Sharif administration
Pakistan Army officers
Pakistan Muslim League (N) politicians
Pakistani chief executives
Pakistani industrialists
People from Haripur District
Speakers of the National Assembly of Pakistan
Children of national leaders
Grand Crosses 1st class of the Order of Merit of the Federal Republic of Germany
Children of presidents of Pakistan
Pakistani MNAs 1977
Pakistani MNAs 1990–1993
Pakistani MNAs 1993–1996
Pakistani MNAs 1997–1999
Army Burn Hall College alumni